Lahore General Hospital is a public sector teaching hospital located on Ferozepur Road in Lahore, Punjab, Pakistan. It is affiliated with Ameer-ud-Din Medical College, Lahore.

Recognition
 Lahore General Hospital is accredited by the College of Physicians and Surgeons of Pakistan.

History 
A piece of land measuring one square and seven acre i.e. (256 kanals) situated on Ferozepur, Road, Lahore about 17 kilometers from Lahore was proposed for the construction of a beggar house. The foundation was laid down by Begum Nahid Sikandar Mirza (w/o then governor-general of Pakistan Iskander Mirza), on 27 February 1958. The first phase of the building was completed in late 1958. An opening ceremony was held on 30 September 1958 by Nahid Mirza.

Due to some reasons the proposed beggar house plan was sacked and it was decided by then government leaders to provide health facilities to the general public, leading to the creation of the hospital.  At that time, the hospital was used as a convalescent home for the overflow of patients from Mayo Hospital in Lahore, and there were no adequate treatment or diagnostic facilities available at Lahore General Hospital.

The department of neurosurgery of King Edward Medical College, Lahore, was set up at the hospital in 1966. This department was housed in an old building temporarily till 1981. Then, after the creation of Postgraduate Medical Institute Lahore in 1974, Lahore General Hospital Lahore was affiliated with the Postgraduate Medical Institute in July 1975.

In 1995, on the shifting of Allama Iqbal Medical College to a new campus, the Jinnah Hospital complex was affiliated with AIMC and PGMI was shifted to Services Hospital, Lahore. The Lahore General Hospital was attached with AIMC. This continued till 31 May 1997. Then, again, LGH was attached with PGMI on 31 May 1997. At present, all these departments are attached with PGMI Lahore, including the neurosurgery department.

On 1 July 1998, Lahore General Hospital was declared as an autonomous hospital. Dr. Sabiha Khurshid Ahmad was appointed as 1st chief executive of this hospital. After the autonomy, new operation theaters of urology and orthopedics were started, which lowered the huge burden of SOT. SOT was renovated and a new recovery room was added to it. A laundry plant was also installed. Seven rooms for private patients were added in the general ward in addition to eighteen rooms in the neurosurgery department.

In 2017, it became the first public sector hospital at which a laparoscopic sleeve gastrectomy was performed. It was recently exempted from all utility taxes.

On 12 December 2020, Punjab Chief Minister Sardar Usman Buzdar announced an expansion of the hospital, which would include 400 beds in the general ward, 400 beds in cardiology, and 200 beds in blood diseases wards.

Clinical departments
 Anatomy
 Biochemistry
 Dermatology
 Medicine
 Neurology
 Obstetrics & gynaecology
 Orthopedics
 Pathology
 Pharmacology
 Plastic surgery
 Pulmonology
 Urology
 Anesthesia
 Community medicine
 Forensic medicine
 Nephrology
 Neurosurgery
 Ophthalmology
 Otorhinolaryngology / ENT
 Pediatrics
 Physiology
 Psychiatry
 Radiology
 Surgery

References

External links
Lahore General Hospital's website

Hospital buildings completed in 1959
Hospitals in Lahore
Teaching hospitals in Pakistan
Hospitals established in 1958